Kittitas is a city in Kittitas County, Washington, United States. The population was 1,381 at the 2010 census and an estimated 1,493 in 2018.

There are numerous interpretations of the name, which is from the language of the Kittitas American Indian Sahaptin language. According to toponymist William Bright, the name "Kittitas" comes from the Sahaptin placename [k'ɨtɨtáš], referring to a gravel bank in the Yakima River. According to Jennifer Cochran, it "has been said to mean everything from 'white chalk' to 'shale rock' to 'shoal people' to 'land of beauty', and that most anthropologists and historians concede that each interpretation has some validity depending upon the particular dialect spoken."

History

Kittitas was established in 1883 and officially incorporated on December 9, 1931. It was founded as part of the westward expansion of the Chicago, Milwaukee, St. Paul and Pacific Railroad. The Kittitas Yard and Depot became the center of the community of Kittitas, one of the many small, agricultural towns that sprang up along the railroad lines. The railroad linked Kittitas to other small communities and the rest of the country, providing farmers and business people a way to sell their products in other towns and cities.

A post office, general merchandise and drug store, a Baptist church, agricultural warehouses, and other small businesses were built around the small depot. Along with the depot, the Kittitas Yard included storage and maintenance buildings, a water tower, and other structures necessary for the maintenance of a major transcontinental railroad.

The depot is the only significant structure still intact at the Kittitas Yard. It is an excellent example of turn-of-the-century railroad architecture, and as such was placed on the National Register of Historic Places in 1992. The depot is owned and managed by the Washington State Parks and Recreation Commission.

The Milwaukee Road, the popular name for the Chicago, Milwaukee, St. Paul, and Pacific Railroad, was founded in 1847 to serve the area from Mississippi to Wisconsin. Within 50 years, it became one of the most prosperous railroads in the country. In 1905, Milwaukee Road officials began expanding west, running lines from Chicago to Seattle. At the same time, they decided to electrify the lines through the western mountains, to increase operating efficiency. Despite the increased efficiency, the financial stability of the railroad began to crumble, prompted by the high cost of the western expansion, electrical expenses, and competition with other railroads and ships using the newly opened Panama Canal. In 1980, the last Milwaukee train traveled over the Cascades, and thereafter the system served only the Midwest.

The Milwaukee Road once served as a vital link, providing economic and social connections between small, scattered communities in Washington. Today, it is once more a link between these communities, for people who hike, bike, or ride horses along the route.

Geography
Kittitas is located in eastern Kittitas County at  (46.983821, -120.418284). Interstate 90 passes through the south end of the city, with access from Exit 115. I-90 leads west  to Seattle and east  to Spokane.

Climate
This region experiences warm and dry summers, with no average monthly temperatures above 71.6 °F.  According to the Köppen Climate Classification system, Kittitas has a warm-summer Mediterranean climate, abbreviated "Csb" on climate maps.

Demographics

2010 census
As of the census of 2010, there were 1,381 people, 543 households, and 366 families residing in the city. The racial makeup of the city was 86.7% White, 0.6% African American, 0.9% Native American, 0.3% Asian, 8.2% from other races, and 3.3% from two or more races. Hispanic or Latino of any race were 13.1% of the population.

There were 543 households, of which 39.2% had children under the age of 18 living with them, 47.1% were married couples living together, 14.7% had a female householder with no husband present, 5.5% had a male householder with no wife present, and 32.6% were non-families. 27.3% of all households were made up of individuals, and 9.6% had someone living alone who was 65 years of age or older. The average household size was 2.54 and the average family size was 3.05.

The median age in the city was 33.3 years. 28.4% of residents were under the age of 18; 10.1% were between the ages of 18 and 24; 26.9% were from 25 to 44; 21.9% were from 45 to 64; and 12.7% were 65 years of age or older. The gender makeup of the city was 50.4% male and 49.6% female.

2000 census
As of the census of 2000, there were 1,105 people, 443 households, and 295 families residing in the city. The population density was 1,813.7 people per square mile (699.4/km2). There were 510 housing units at an average density of 837.1 per square mile (322.8/km2). The racial makeup of the city was 92.13% White, 0.63% African American, 1.18% Native American, 0.09% Asian, 0.18% Pacific Islander, 4.62% from other races, and 1.18% from two or more races. Hispanic or Latino of any race were 11.58% of the population.

There were 443 households, out of which 34.5% had children under the age of 18 living with them, 49.4% were married couples living together, 11.3% had a female householder with no husband present, and 33.4% were non-families. 27.3% of all households were made up of individuals, and 8.8% had someone living alone who was 65 years of age or older. The average household size was 2.49 and the average family size was 3.02.

In the city, the population was spread out, with 29.1% under the age of 18, 9.8% from 18 to 24, 30.3% from 25 to 44, 19.8% from 45 to 64, and 11.0% who were 65 years of age or older. The median age was 32 years. For every 100 females, there were 94.9 males. For every 100 females age 18 and over, there were 98.2 males.

The median income for a household in the city was $26,985, and the median income for a family was $31,382. Males had a median income of $29,803 versus $20,563 for females. The per capita income for the city was $11,589. About 18.2% of families and 24.8% of the population were below the poverty line, including 29.2% of those under age 18 and 11.4% of those age 65 or over.

References

External links
Official website

Cities in Washington (state)
Cities in Kittitas County, Washington
Washington placenames of Native American origin